Matt Smith (born 26 October 1989 in Hexham) is a rugby union footballer who plays lock for Leeds Tykes and England Students.

References 

1989 births
Living people
Cornish Pirates players
English rugby union players
Leeds Tykes players
Rugby union players from Hexham
Rugby union locks